Fenland Airfield or Fenland Aerodrome  is located  southeast of the town Spalding near the small village of Holbeach St Johns in Lincolnshire, England.

Fenland Aerodrome provides general aviation operations and is a UK Civil Aviation Authority licensed aerodrome. This permits the airfield to be used for take-off and landing of aircraft engaged in flights for the purpose of public transport of passengers, including for the purpose of instruction in flying which is conducted by Fenland Flying School. The aerodrome operates on a non-PPR (Prior Permission Required) basis, except for non-radio flights and aircraft requiring Jet A-1 fuel.

Airfield facilities

The airfield provides a wide range of facilities for pilots and pilot students from throughout Lincolnshire and its neighbouring counties Norfolk and Cambridgeshire, including a restaurant service, aircraft and helicopter refueling for 'fly-in' visitors, aircraft charter, and aircraft maintenance services by licensed onsite aircraft maintenance and avionics technicians. Pilot flight training is conducted in the school's own fleet of United Kingdom (G) registered light aircraft, consisting of types Cessna 152, Cessna 172 Skyhawk's, Robin DR360 Chevalier and a SIAI-Marchetti S.205-20/R, including a ground school solo flight simulator.

Annually the aerodrome also stages various public air display shows and other public events around aviation. The aerodrome is also close by to RAF Holbeach Air Weapons Range located along the Lincolnshire coastline on The Wash.

See also
 General aviation in the United Kingdom
 List of general aviation activities
 Private pilot
 Pilot licensing and certification
 Pilot licensing in the United Kingdom

References

External links

Fenland Airfield
Fenland Flying School

Airports in England
Transport in Lincolnshire
Airports in Lincolnshire